The Pere Marquette Railway  operated in the Great Lakes region of the United States and southern parts of Ontario in Canada.  It had trackage in the states of Michigan, Ohio, Indiana and the Canadian province of Ontario. Its primary connections included Buffalo; Toledo; and Chicago. 
The company was named after Père (French for Father) Jacques Marquette S.J. (1637–1675), a French Jesuit missionary who founded Michigan's first European settlement, Sault Ste Marie.

History 

The Pere Marquette Railroad was incorporated on November 1, 1899 in anticipation of a merger of three Michigan-based railroad companies that had been agreed upon by all parties. It began operations on January 1, 1900, absorbing the following companies:
 Flint & Pere Marquette Railroad (F&PM)
 Detroit, Grand Rapids & Western Railroad (DGR&W)
 Chicago & West Michigan Railway (C&WM)

The company was reincorporated on March 12, 1917 as the Pere Marquette Railway. In the 1920s the Pere Marquette came under the control of Cleveland financiers Oris and Mantis Van Sweringen. These brothers also controlled the New York, Chicago & St. Louis Railroad (Nickel Plate), the Erie Railroad and the Chesapeake & Ohio Railway, and planned to merge the four companies. However, the ICC did not approve the merger and the Van Sweringens eventually sold their interest in the Pere Marquette to the C&O in 1929. The company continued to operate separately as the Pere Marquette Railway until being fully merged into the C&O on June 6, 1947. Forty years later, the C&O was absorbed into CSX Transportation.

In 1984, Amtrak named its passenger train between Chicago and Grand Rapids, Michigan the Pere Marquette.

The train in the 2004 film The Polar Express was modeled after steam locomotive Pere Marquette 1225. The film also included audio recordings of the locomotive in operation. It is the locomotive that Chris Van Allsburg said was the inspiration for the book, having seen it as a child when it was on the Michigan State University campus. The locomotive was scheduled to be at the premiere in Grand Rapids, where the writer was born, but was canceled because of interferences with the schedule of CSX. It is now housed and maintained at the Steam Railroading Institute in Owosso, Michigan.

Surviving Steam Locomotives 

1. PM 1223 - 2-8-4 "Berkshire" displayed at Chinook Pier in Grand Haven, Michigan. PM 1223 is the oldest surviving example of the 2-8-4s in America.

2. PM 1225 - 2-8-4 "Berkshire" operational by the Steam Railroading Institute in Owosso, Michigan. PM 1225 is the real steam locomotive that made an appearance in the Warner Bros movie The Polar Express.

1907 wreck 
On July 20, 1907 an excursion train carrying 800 passengers from Ionia to Detroit collided near Salem with a freight train, killing 31 and injuring 101. The accident apparently happened because of a hand-written schedule on unlined paper whose columns did not line up, and was misread by the freight crew. The Interstate Commerce Commission investigation also cited safety violations, including use of pine instead of oak for car walls and the omission of steel plates required for mail cars. This was Michigan's worst rail disaster.

Routes and current disposition 

 Toledo Division — Saginaw, Michigan to Alexis, Ohio and (via trackage rights over Ann Arbor Railroad) Toledo, Ohio (In use by CSX Transportation south of Plymouth, leased to Lake State Railway north of Plymouth)
 Ludington Division — Saginaw to Ludington, Michigan (Partially now part of the Pere Marquette Rail-Trail, between Baldwin and Ludington in use with Marquette Rail, and Saginaw to Midland used by Lake State Railway Company, with the rest of the line removed in 1991; the ferry closed in 1990)
 Detroit Division — Detroit, Michigan to Grand Rapids, Michigan (In use by CSX)
 Grand Rapids Division — Elmdale, Michigan to Saginaw, Michigan (Alma-Saginaw in use by Mid-Michigan Railroad)
 Chicago Division — Grand Rapids, Michigan to Porter, Indiana and (via trackage rights over various lines) Chicago, Illinois (In use by CSX)
 La Crosse Branch — New Buffalo, Michigan to La Crosse, Indiana (Abandoned north of Wellsboro, Indiana by C&O in 1989, most tracks removed; Wellsboro to La Crosse in use by the Chesapeake and Indiana Railroad)
 Petoskey Division — Grand Rapids, Michigan to Bay View, Michigan was the basis for the Pere Marquette's longest route, the Chicago and Detroit-Bay View Resort Special. (In use by Marquette Rail between Grand Rapids and Manistee and by the Great Lakes Central Railroad between Grawn and Williamsburg, with the rest dismantled in 1983 after being abandoned by C&O in 1982)
 Canadian Division — Lines in Canada, including Windsor, Ontario and Sarnia, Ontario via Blenheim, Ontario to St. Thomas, Ontario and St Thomas east to Buffalo, New York via trackage rights over the Canada Southern (Toronto, Hamilton and Buffalo Railway trackage rights over CASO from Welland, Ontario to Buffalo via Niagara Falls, Ontario).
 Saginaw Subdivisions — Saginaw, Michigan to Port Huron, Michigan via two routes and to Bay City, Michigan (Mostly abandoned between 1951 and 1988, some sections in use with the Huron and Eastern Railway)

Car ferries 

The Pere Marquette operated a number of rail car ferries on the Detroit and St. Clair Rivers and on Lake Erie and Lake Michigan. The PM's fleet of car ferries, which operated on Lake Michigan from Ludington, Michigan to Milwaukee, Kewaunee, and Manitowoc, Wisconsin (see SS Badger), were an important transportation link avoiding the terminal and interchange delays around the southern tip of Lake Michigan and through Chicago. Their superintendent for over 30 years was William L. Mercereau.

Pere Marquette 18 

On September 10, 1910, Pere Marquette No. 18 was bound for Milwaukee, Wisconsin, from Ludington, Michigan, with a load of 29 railroad freight cars and 62 people on board. Near midnight, the vessel began to take on massive amounts of water. The captain dumped nine railroad cars into Lake Michigan, but this was no use—the ship was going down.  The Pere Marquette 17, traveling nearby, picked up the distress call and sped to assist the foundering vessel.  Soon after she arrived and she could come alongside, the Pere Marquette 18 sank with the loss of 28 lives; there were 33 survivors.
The wreck was not found until July 23, 2020.

See also
History of railroads in Michigan
Pere Marquette 1225

References

Pere Marquette Historical Society
PM 1225 Steam Railroading Institute

External links

 Pere Marquette System Map
 Remembering the Pere Marquette Railway (Kevin Keefe)

 
Railway companies established in 1917
Railway companies disestablished in 1947
Defunct Illinois railroads
Defunct Indiana railroads
Defunct Michigan railroads
Defunct Ohio railroads
Defunct Ontario railways
Railroads in the Chicago metropolitan area
Predecessors of the Chesapeake and Ohio Railway
Former Class I railroads in the United States
Defunct New York (state) railroads
1917 establishments in Michigan
1947 disestablishments in Ohio
1947 mergers and acquisitions